Showtime is an American premium cable and satellite television network. Showtime's programming primarily includes theatrically released motion pictures and original television series, along with boxing and mixed martial arts matches, occasional stand-up comedy specials and made-for-TV movies.

Current programming

Drama

Comedy

Miniseries

Unscripted

Docuseries

Variety

Sports
Showtime Championship Boxing (1986)
ShoBox: The New Generation (2001)
Bellator MMA (2021)

Adult
AVN Awards (2009)

Upcoming programming

Drama

Comedy

Co-productions

Continuations
These shows have been picked up by Showtime for additional seasons after having aired previous seasons on another network.

Miniseries

SkyShowtime regional original programming
These shows are originals because Showtime commissioned or acquired them and will have their premiere on the SkyShowtime service, but they will not be available worldwide.

Pilots

Drama
Coercion

Comedy
Mason
Seasoned
The Wood

In development
All Her Little Secrets
Billions: London
Billions: Miami
Blocks
Gattaca
Jumpmen
Love Canal
Millions
Panda
Rivkah
Trillions
Untitled football drama
Untitled Trinity Killer series
 The Whites

Former programming
The following is a list of Showtime original programs that have appeared on the channel in the past.

Drama

Comedy

Miniseries

Animation

Unscripted

Docuseries

Reality

Variety

Sports

Stand-up comedy

Co-productions

Adult

Original films
Showtime has produced original films under two titles: "Showtime Original Pictures" and "Showtime Original Pictures for All Ages" (originally "Showtime Original Pictures for Kids"), the latter of which are made-for-cable films targeted at families:

1980s
Cheaters (September 27, 1980)
A Case of Libel (1983)
Cat on a Hot Tin Roof (August 19, 1984)
The Ratings Game (December 15, 1984)
Elayne Boosler: Party of One (1985)
Slow Burn (June 29, 1986)
J. Edgar Hoover (January 11, 1987)
Broadway Baby (1987)
Gotham (August 21, 1988)
Richard Jeni: The Boy from New York City  (1989)

1990–1994
Deceptions (June 10, 1990)
Rainbow Drive (September 8, 1990)
Psycho IV: The Beginning (November 10, 1990)
Fourth Story (January 19, 1991)
Flight of Black Angel (February 23, 1991)
Paris Trout (April 20, 1991)
Payoff (June 22, 1991)
Deadly Surveillance (September 6, 1991)
Intimate Stranger (November 15, 1991)
Richard Jeni: Crazy from the Heat (1991)
Public Enemy #2 (1991)
Keeper of the City (January 25, 1992)
Black Magic (March 21, 1992)
Boris and Natasha: The Movie (April 17, 1992)
Sketch Artist (June 27, 1992)
Nails (July 25, 1992)
The Fear Inside (August 9, 1992)
Devlin (September 12, 1992)
Freddy Speaks (September 19, 1992)
Mastergate (November 1, 1992)
Double Jeopardy (November 21, 1992)
When a Stranger Calls Back (April 4, 1993)
Scam (May 22, 1993)
Taking the Heat (June 6, 1993)
Chantilly Lace (July 18, 1993)
Body Bags (August 8, 1993)
Praying Mantis (August 11, 1993)
Last Light (August 22, 1993)
Lush Life (October 1993)
Children of the Mist (November 14, 1993)
Love, Cheat and Steal (December 5, 1993)
Heads (January 29, 1994)
Assault at West Point: The Court-Martial of Johnson Whittaker (February 27, 1994)
The Birds II: Land's End (March 14, 1994)
But... Seriously (March 26, 1994)
Royce (April 3, 1994)
Past Tense (June 12, 1994)
Sodbusters (July 17, 1994)
Roadracers (July 22, 1994) 
Confessions of a Sorority Girl (July 29, 1994) 
Roswell (July 31, 1994)
Motorcycle Gang (August 5, 1994)
Runaway Daughters (August 12, 1994)
Parallel Lives (August 14, 1994)
Girls in Prison (August 19, 1994)
Attack of the 5 Ft. 2 In. Women (August 21, 1994)
Shake, Rattle and Rock! (August 26, 1994)
Dragstrip Girl (September 2, 1994)
Next Door (September 4, 1994)
Jailbreakers (September 9, 1994)
Cool and the Crazy (September 16, 1994)
Reform School Girl (September 23, 1994)
Dead Air (October 6, 1994)
Probable Cause (November 20, 1994)

1995
Sketch Artist II: Hands That See (January 28, 1995)
Solomon & Sheba (February 26, 1995)
Zooman (March 19, 1995)
Sahara (April 25, 1995)
Trade-Off (April 29, 1995)
The Tin Soldier (May 27, 1995)
Triplecross (May 28, 1995)
Young Ivanhoe (July 3, 1995)
Suspect Device (July 11, 1995) 
Convict Cowboy (July 16, 1995)
The Alien Within (July 18, 1995)
The Set-Up (July 23, 1995)
Sawbones (July 25, 1995) 
Virtual Seduction (August 1, 1995)
Hiroshima (August 6, 1995)
Burial of the Rats (August 8, 1995)
Harrison Bergeron (August 13, 1995)
Not Like Us (August 15, 1995)
Amanda and the Alien (August 20, 1995)
Black Scorpion (August 22, 1995)
The Wasp Woman (August 29, 1995)
The Wharf Rat (September 3, 1995)
Not of This Earth (September 5, 1995)
Bloodknot (September 7, 1995)
A Bucket of Blood (September 12, 1995)
The Courtyard (September 24, 1995)
Max is Missing (September 24, 1995)
Hellfire  (September 26, 1995)
The Man in the Attic (September 27, 1995)
Piranha (October 1, 1995)
Terminal Virus (October 3, 1995)
Dead Weekend (October 8, 1995)
Down Came a Blackbird (October 22, 1995)
Annie O (October 29, 1995)
Full Body Massage (November 5, 1995)
Favorite Deadly Sins (November 12, 1995)
The Song Spinner (November 19, 1995)
Out There (November 19, 1995)
Silver Strand (November 26, 1995)
Daisies in December (December 3, 1995)
Slave of Dreams (December 10, 1995)
Where Evil Lies

1996
The Right to Remain Silent (January 7, 1996)
The Halfback of Notre Dame (January 21, 1996)
Woman Undone (February 4, 1996)
Robin of Locksley (February 26, 1996)
Conundrum (March 3, 1996)
Heck's Way Home (March 8, 1996)
Undertow (March 24, 1996)
Mr. and Mrs. Loving (March 31, 1996)
Sabrina the Teenage Witch (April 7, 1996)
Homecoming (April 14, 1996)
Yesterday's Target (April 28, 1996)
Moonshine Highway (May 5, 1996)
Salt Water Moose (June 2, 1996)
Lily Dale (June 9, 1996)
Run for the Dream: The Gail Devers Story (June 16, 1996)
Beyond the Call (June 23, 1996)
The Limbic Region (June 30, 1996)
Spectre (July 13, 1996)
Escape Clause (July 14, 1996)
Inhumanoid (July 20, 1996)
Miami Hustle (July 21, 1996)
Alien Avengers (August 3, 1996)
Shadow of a Scream (August 10, 1996)
Subliminal Seduction (August 10, 1996)
Ruby Jean and Joe (August 11, 1996)
Last Exit to Earth (August 17, 1996)
Losing Chase (August 18, 1996)
Inside (August 25, 1996)
Prisoner of Zenda, Inc. (September 1, 1996)
Gang in Blue (September 8, 1996)
Humanoids from the Deep (September 14, 1996)
Death Game (September 21, 1996)
September (September 25, 1996)
Vampirella (September 28, 1996)
Scene of the Crime (October 5, 1996)
When the Bullet Hits the Bone (October 12, 1996)
Marquis de Sade (October 19, 1996)
Shadow Zone: The Undead Express (October 27, 1996)
Hidden in America (December 1, 1996)
Critical Choices (December 8, 1996)
Marshal Law (December 16, 1996)

1997–1999
Whiskers (January 5, 1997)
Mercenary (January 17, 1997)
Mandela and de Klerk (February 16, 1997)
Dad's Week Off (March 27, 1997)
Ronnie & Julie (March 30, 1997)
In the Presence of Mine Enemies (April 20, 1997)
Riot (April 27, 1997)
Legend of the Lost Tomb (May 1997)
When Time Expires (May 10, 1997)
Black Scorpion II (May 13, 1997)
The Garden of Redemption (May 25, 1997)
In His Father's Shoes (June 15, 1997)
Desert's Edge (June 25, 1997)
North Shore Fish (June 29, 1997)
Business for Pleasure (July 2, 1997)
The Unspeakable (1997)
Elvis Meets Nixon (August 10, 1997)
The Don's Analyst (September 6, 1997)
Color of Justice (September 7, 1997)
Get a Clue (September 14, 1997)
Lolita (September 25, 1997)
Gold Coast (September 28, 1997)
Rescuers: Stories of Courage: Two Women (October 5, 1997)
Joe Torre: Curveballs Along the Way (October 17, 1997)
Alien Avengers II (October 25, 1997)
Spacejacked (November 8, 1997)
The Haunted Sea (November 17, 1997)
Alone (December 21, 1997)
Woman Undone (December 22, 1997)
Tricks (December 22, 1997)
The Tale of Sweeney Todd (April 19, 1998)
Running Wild (July 26, 1998)
Rescuers: Stories of Courage: Two Couples (May 10, 1998)
Rescuers: Stories of Courage: Two Families (September 21, 1998)
The Devil's Arithmetic (March 28, 1999)
Freak City (April 1999)
Inherit the Wind (May 29, 1999)
The Passion of Ayn Rand (May 30, 1999)
A Cooler Climate (August 22, 1999)
Brotherhood of Murder (December 12, 1999)

2000s
Enslavement: The True Story of Fanny Kemble (April 2000)
Rated X (May 13, 2000)
Dirty Pictures (May 20, 2000)
Seventeen Again (2000)
Ratz (July 9, 2000)
Things Behind the Sun (January 24, 2001)
Bojangles (February 2, 2001)
Things You Can Tell Just by Looking at Her (March 11, 2001)
My Horrible Year! (July 4, 2001)
Keep the Faith, Baby (February 2002)
10,000 Black Men Named George (February 2002)
Last Call (May 25, 2002)
Soldier's Girl (January 20, 2003)
Carry Me Home (February 3, 2003)
The Roman Spring of Mrs. Stone (May 4, 2003)
Jasper, Texas (June 8, 2003)
The Maldonado Miracle (October 12, 2003)
The Reagans (November 30, 2003)
The Lion in Winter (December 12, 2003)
Parasite (2004)
Sucker Free City (2004)
Reversal of Fortune (2005)
Our Fathers (May 2005)
An American Crime (May 5, 2008)

2020s
Ray Donovan: The Movie (2022)

Notes

References

Showtime